Merete is a given name. Notable people with the given name include:

Merete Agerbak-Jensen (born 1967), Norwegian politician
Merete Ahnfeldt-Mollerup (born 1963), Danish architect, university professor and writer 
Merete Alfsen (born 1950), Norwegian translator
Merete Morken Andersen (born 1965), Norwegian novelist, children's writer and magazine editor
Merete Armand (1955–2017), Norwegian actress
Merete Barker (born 1944), Danish artist
Merete Fjeldavlie (born 1968), Norwegian alpine skier
Merete Gerlach-Nielsen (1933–2019), Danish academic
Merete Erbou Laurent (born 1949), Danish weaver and textile artist
Merete Møller (born 1978), Danish team handball player 
Merete Myklebust (born 1973), Norwegian footballer
Merete Pedersen (born 1973), Danish footballer
Merete Ries (1938–2018), Danish publisher and editor
Merete Riisager (born 1976), Danish politician
Merete Skavlan (1920–2018), Norwegian actress, theatre instructor and director
Merete Van Kamp, Danish actress and singer
Merete Wiger (1921–2015), Norwegian novelist, author of short stories, children's writer and playwright

Feminine given names
Given names derived from gemstones